Zurab Gigashvili (born 20 November 2001) is a Georgian professional football player. He plays for Telavi.

Club career
He made his debut in the Russian Premier League for FC Tambov on 5 December 2020 in a game against FC Spartak Moscow. He started the game and played a full match in a 1–5 away loss.

References

External links
 
 

2001 births
Footballers from Tbilisi
Living people
Footballers from Georgia (country)
Association football defenders
FC Armavir players
FC Tambov players
FC Kryvbas Kryvyi Rih players
Russian Premier League players
Expatriate footballers from Georgia (country)
Expatriate footballers in Turkey
Expatriate sportspeople from Georgia (country) in Turkey
Expatriate footballers in Russia
Expatriate sportspeople from Georgia (country) in Russia
Expatriate footballers in Ukraine
Expatriate sportspeople from Georgia (country) in Ukraine